Anbe Sivam is a 2003 Indian Tamil-language comedy drama film directed by Sundar C. and produced by K. Muralitharan, V. Swaminathan and G. Venugopal under the banner of Lakshmi Movie Makers. The film was written by Kamal Haasan, and Madhan provided the dialogues. Anbe Sivam stars Haasan, Madhavan and Kiran Rathod, with Nassar, Santhana Bharathi, Seema and Uma Riyaz Khan playing supporting characters. The film tells the story of Nallasivam and Anbarasu, two men of contrasting personalities who undertake an unexpected journey from Bhubaneswar to Chennai.

Produced on a budget of 120 million, Anbe Sivam takes on themes such as communism, atheism, and altruism and depicts Haasan's humanist views. The music was composed by Vidyasagar. Arthur A. Wilson served as the cinematographer and M. Prabhaharan served as the art director.

The film was released on 15 January 2003 to positive reviews from critics but underperformed at the box office. Despite its initial failure, it has gained recognition over the years through re-runs on television channels and is now regarded as a classic of Tamil cinema and a cult film. Anbe Sivam was screened as part of the Indian Panorama section of the International Film Festival of India in 2003. At the 51st Filmfare Awards South, it received a Special Jury Award and nominations in the Best Film and Best Actor (Haasan) categories. Madhavan was awarded Best Actor at the 2003 Tamil Nadu State Film Awards.

Plot 
Two men waiting for a flight to Chennai at the Biju Patnaik Airport in Bhubaneswar engage in conversation. One is a commercial director, Anbarasu, who prefers the abbreviated name A.Aras, and the other is a scarred and deformed socialist, Nallasivam (Nalla). When the flight is cancelled due to heavy rain, Aras initially suspects Nalla is a terrorist and informs the authorities, only to discover that he was mistaken. With the rain flooding the city, the two men are forced to share a room for the night. Both need to return to Chennai: Aras to be present at his wedding, and Nalla has to deliver a 3,200,000 cheque, recently awarded to him after he won a court case, to a group of union workers.

After a traumatic night, and no hope for a flight, the two men take a bus to board the Coromandel Express train. Aras's bag gets stolen on the way leaving him with only his credit card, which no one accepts. Using his presence of mind, Nalla repeatedly bails Aras out of trouble while Aras tries escaping from him at every juncture, only to end up with him again. While waiting for the train at the Ichchapuram railway station, Nalla begins to tell Aras his story.

A few years earlier, a healthy Nalla took part in various street theatre performances protesting against multinational corporation-driven industrialisation, which resulted in the marginalisation of the labour force. He was at odds with Kandasamy Padayatchi, a manipulative factory owner who refused to give his workers a raise. Nalla satirically imitated Padayatchi in many of his shows. In an unexpected turn of events, Nalla and Balasaraswathi (Bala), Padayatchi's daughter, fell in love with each other. To avoid a potential conflict with Padayatchi, the two decided to elope to Kerala.

Nalla boarded a bus bound for Kerala, and on his way to meet Bala, the bus met with an accident on a hillside, leaving him scarred, disfigured, and partially paralysed for life. After recovering from his wounds, he visited Bala only to be informed by Padayatchi that his daughter was already married and has settled abroad. Padayatchi had earlier lied to Bala that Nalla died in the accident. It was also at this time that Nalla became a firm believer in kindness and love. Despite suffering from an inferiority complex due to his scarred and deformed body, Nalla performs community service and social work with renewed fervour while continuing to fight for union causes.

Upon their arrival in Chennai, Aras delivers Nalla's cheque to the union workers. He invites Nalla to his wedding, where, to his utter astonishment, Nalla sees that Aras's bride is Bala. Padayatchi spots Nalla and asks him why he is at the wedding. He tells Padayatchi that he was invited by Aras, and later persuades him to sign the papers which will help Padayatchi's workers get a raise. To prevent the disruption of Bala's wedding and avoid damaging his own reputation, Padayatchi yields to Nalla's demands. After signing the papers, Padayatchi instructs his assistant to eliminate Nalla. However, his assistant has a change of heart as he is about to kill him. Padayatchi's assistant believes that the misdeeds he committed for Padayatchi resulted in the death of the assistant's daughter. Padayatchi's assistant requests Nalla to stay as far away from his boss as possible. Nalla assents and walks away.

Cast 

 Kamal Haasan as Nallasivam
 Madhavan as Anbarasu (A. Aras)
 Kiran Rathod as Balasaraswathi
 Nassar as Kandasamy Padayatchi
 Santhana Bharathi as Padayatchi's assistant
 Seema as Balasaraswathi's aunt
 Yugi Sethu as Uthaman
 R. S. Shivaji as the Ichchapuram railway station master
 Vishwanath as Padayatchi's assistant
 Balu Anand as the train ticket checker for the Coromandel Express
 Ilavarasu as a police inspector and aide of Padayatchi
 Muthukaalai as a roadside drunkard
 Uma Riyaz Khan as Mehrunissa
 Pasi Sathya as a tea stall owner
 Nellai Siva as a street theatre performer
 Benjamin as a street theatre performer
 Poovilangu Mohan as a grieving father
 Kalairani as a grieving mother
 Krishnamoorthy as a union worker
 Sujatha Narayanan as a tea shop owner who helps Nallasivam
 Madhan as himself
 Poo Ramu as a dancer in "Naatukkoru Seithi"<ref>{{Cite web |last=மாதேவன் |first=சந்தோஷ் |title=அன்பே சிவம்' கமல் கதாபாத்திரம் என்னுடையதுதான்..! - 'பூ' ராமு |url=https://cinema.vikatan.com/kollywood/155390-an-exclusive-interview-with-actor-poo-ramu |access-date=2023-01-24 |website=Ananda Vikatan |language=ta |archive-date=24 January 2023 |archive-url=https://web.archive.org/web/20230124165330/https://cinema.vikatan.com/kollywood/155390-an-exclusive-interview-with-actor-poo-ramu |url-status=live }}</ref>
 Vasanthi as a dancer in "Naatukkoru Seithi"

 Production 
 Development 
In the late 1990s, Kamal Haasan narrated the premise of a film to the director K. S. Ravikumar as they sought to collaborate following Avvai Shanmughi (1996). The initial script followed two men who meet in a train, quarrel, become friends and ultimately, one of them sacrifices everything for the other man. One individual was a Sri Lankan Tamil communist, while the other was a person who followed a right-wing political belief. Haasan had wanted to act in the film alongside Mohanlal, but Ravikumar refused the opportunity, saying it was not his usual film genre of expertise. Haasan and Ravikumar instead moved on to work on a different project titled Thenali (2000) and chose to make the film's title character a Sri Lankan Tamil as discussed in the earlier script.

After completing the draft for the film's script with alterations in early 2002, Haasan approached the Malayalam filmmaker Priyadarshan to direct it. The two men were keen to work together since the late 1990s, and upon reading the script, Priyadarshan believed that it had the potential to be an "emotional love story". The film's title Anbe Sivam was derived from the Shaivite saint Tirumular's poem Tirumantiram. In June 2002, Priyadarshan opted out of the project owing to creative differences. Sundar C. came in as a replacement to work on the film. Anbe Sivam was co-produced and distributed by V. Swaminathan, K.Muralitharan and G.Venugopal under the production banner of Lakshmi Movie Makers.

 Cast and crew 
In addition to being the film's writer, Haasan also played the central character, Nallasivam. Madhavan was selected to play Anbarasu in January 2002. According to Kiran Rathod, she received a phone call from Haasan's office informing her that she was offered the role of Balasaraswathi, which she accepted. Rathod's voice in the film was dubbed by the singer Anuradha Sriram. Uma Riyaz Khan played the role of Nallasivam's friend and professional colleague, Mehrunissa. In a 2019 interview with The Indian Express, the film's script assistant and costume designer, Sujatha Narayanan, revealed that Nandita Das and Shobana were the original choices for Balasaraswathi and Mehrunissa respectively and that both of them declined due to schedule conflicts.

The actors Nassar and Santhana Bharathi played the roles of Kandasamy Padaiyatchi and his assistant, respectively, while cartoonist Madhan featured in a cameo appearance as himself in addition to writing the film's dialogues. Screenwriter Crazy Mohan also collaborated with Haasan on writing some dialogues for the film. In an interview with S.R. Ashok Kumar of The Hindu in 2006, Bharathi considered both Anbe Sivam and Michael Madana Kama Rajan (1990) to be the favourite roles of his career.

Arthur A. Wilson, M. Prabhaharan and P. Sai Suresh handled the film's cinematography, art direction and editing, respectively. Brinda, Chinni Prakash and Dinesh Kumar were in charge of the choreography while the stunt sequences were co-ordinated by Vikram Dharma. Muthulakshmi Varadhan, Bharathi's sister-in-law, worked as an assistant editor in the film. The make-up for Haasan's scars was designed by Michael Westmore and Anil Pemgirkar. In May 2002, Haasan completed the makeup for his character Nallasivam in Los Angeles after filming the song sequences for Panchatanthiram (2002).

 Filming 
Principal photography for Anbe Sivam commenced in July 2002. The first scene featuring the lead actors was shot at Pollachi Junction railway station. Haasan and Madhavan interacted closely during the initial stages of the shoot to ensure that the on-screen chemistry between the pair was apparent.Anbe Sivam was shot on a restricted budget of 120 million, with the train and bus disaster sequences involving the use of settings and CGI. Madhavan, who began shooting his portions in September 2002, stated the film was shot in relatively empty locations. The flood scenes set in Odisha were re-created with outdoor sets consisting of city roads submerged under water erected in the Odisha-Andhra Pradesh border. Filming also took place in Chennai, Visakhapatnam and on the Tamil Nadu-Karnataka border. For a brief sequence in the "Naatukkoru Seithi" song, Haasan learnt how to play the thavil, a barrel-shaped percussion instrument, over three weeks. The pre-climax scenes were filmed in what was then known as the Campa Cola compound in Guindy. The climax scenes were filmed in a single take.

 Themes and influences Anbe Sivam follows the events of a journey from Bhubaneswar to Chennai undertaken by two men of contrasting personalities: Nallasivam, a physically challenged and witty socialist, and Anbarasu, a commercial director who supports capitalism and globalisation. Due to unforeseen circumstances, the two are forced to undertake the journey together. Throughout the narrative, a series of themes pertaining to communism, compassion, globalisation, atheism, and altruism are addressed; the film also showcases Haasan's views as a humanist. According to Haasan, the characterisation of Nallasivam was inspired by the life of Communist playwright, actor, director, lyricist and theorist Safdar Hashmi, who was chiefly associated with his work on street theatre in India. Hashmi died on 2 January 1989 after being attacked by members of the Indian National Congress while staging a play, Halla Bol. S.Anand of Outlook magazine notes that Haasan's views on humanism in the film also seemed to be inspired by those of Charlie Chaplin. M. Kalyanaraman and Abdullah Nurullah of The Times of India opined that Nallasivam shared similar characteristics with street theatre artist Pralayan. According to Kalyanaraman, Anbe Sivam proposes that man can make morally superior choices when he comes face to face with death. As a result, Haasan indicates that the belief of "Siva is love" is the "final stage of evolution of man into God".

The film critic Baradwaj Rangan, in his review of another Haasan film, Vishwaroopam (2013), found the ethnicity of the characters in the film to be a continuation of Haasan's inclusion of non-Tamil characters in his films. Rangan considered this to be Haasan's acknowledgement of the "interconnectedness of the nation" and "the world beyond India". He noted in his article that Haasan had experimented with the concept before by including the usage of Bengali language and meeting Bengalis in Mahanadhi (1994), a Telugu-speaking love interest in Nammavar (1994), marrying a Bengali woman in Hey Ram (2000), conducting investigations with an American associate in Vettaiyaadu Vilaiyaadu (2006), and marriage to a Frenchwoman in Manmadan Ambu (2010). Rangan notes that in Anbe Sivam, the inclusion of and interaction with the Odia people was another example of including non-Tamil characters in his films. Rangan also compared Haasan's fight sequence with the use of an umbrella to the way he used a book and stool in Thoongathey Thambi Thoongathey (1983).

The basic plot of Anbe Sivam was reported to have similarities with the 1987 road film, Planes, Trains and Automobiles directed by John Hughes, which starred Steve Martin and John Candy. The critics noted Haasan and Madhavan's character share similar traits to that of the roles played by Candy and Martin in that film, respectively. The portrait painted by Nallasivam on the walls of Padayatchi's house is inspired by the Mexican painter Diego Rivera's fresco, Man at the Crossroads. Srinivasa Ramanujam, writing for The Times of India in 2008, noted that the religious undertone in the film was similar to that of Rajinikanth's Baba (2002).

 Music 

The soundtrack album and background score for Anbe Sivam were composed by Vidyasagar and the lyrics for the songs were written by Vairamuthu and P. Vijay. After composing the tune for the title song, Vidyasagar explained the situation of the song to Haasan, who wanted the song to be performed in such a way that the protagonist is singing according to the situation he finds himself in. Vidyasagar suggested that Haasan should sing the song himself to achieve the desired result, which the latter accepted. The song "Mouname Paarvayai" was not included in the film. The song "Poovaasam" is based on the Shuddh Sarang raga. The male portions for the reprise of "Poovaasam" were sung by Sriram Parthasarathy, while the original version was sung by Vijay Prakash. Sadhana Sargam sang her portion of both versions of the song.

Malathi Rangarajan of The Hindu wrote, "Vidyasagar is scaling great heights as a composer. The theme song and the melodious  are pointers. Vairamuthu's lyrics deserve special mention here." Singer Charulatha Mani, in her column for The Hindu, "A Raga's Journey", noted, "Poovaasam" possessed "a charm that is born out of classicism incorporated in a populist piece". Arkay of Rediff.com found the songs to be "at best, okay". M. Suganth of The Times of India, in his review for the music album, "Lovers Special – Vol. 2–4", included "Poovaasam" among the "Hot Picks" of the album.

 Release 
According to S. R. Ashok Kumar of The Hindu, the producers were confident that Anbe Sivam would be a strong competitor at the 50th National Film Awards that they had the film reviewed by the Central Board of Film Certification before the end of 2002 so that they could enter the film into the annual awards list. The film was released on 15 January 2003, which coincided with the Thai Pongal festival. It opened alongside five other films, including Vikram's Dhool, Vijayakanth's Chokka Thangam, and Vaseegara, which featured Vijay.Anbe Sivam was screened as a part of the Indian Panorama section of the International Film Festival of India in 2003. As a tribute to Safdar Hashmi, a special preview of the film was organised by Haasan in association with Safdar Hashmi Memorial Trust (SAHMAT) on 9 January 2003 at Siri Fort Auditorium. The film was dubbed into Telugu as Sathyame Sivam and released on 28 February 2003. It was dubbed into Hindi as Shivam and was released two years later in 2005. After the release of the original Tamil version, the dubbing rights for the Hindi version were sold at a low price, much to the irritation of the lead actors as they were not able to dub for themselves in Hindi.

 Reception 

 Critical response 
Baradwaj Rangan described the film as "Kamal's latest solo attempt to bend, twist, shape-shift Tamil cinema into forms never-before seen." In his review of the film's DVD, M. Suganth, writing for The Times of India, called it "one of the finest movies of the decade" and praised the story, screenplay and dialogues before terming the film as "a modern classic". Reviewing the Telugu dubbed version, Sathyame Sivam, Jeevi of Idlebrain.com said that "this art-kind-of film does entertain the people who love Kamal Hassan flicks" while concluding that it "would remain as one of the good films made in the recent times".

Malathi Rangarajan of The Hindu believed that "well-defined characters, a strong storyline and intelligent screenplay" were the film's "vital ingredients". She further complimented Haasan's treatment of the story, and that his "diligence that has gone into the chiselling of the story and screenplay is only too evident" while calling the film "a laudable effort". P.Devarajan of Business Line appreciated Haasan's performance and facial expressions and concluded his review by stating, "This man has intrigued me and will always." Another critic from The Hindu, Gudipoodi Srihari, appreciated the pair of Haasan and Madhavan, noting that the duo "make a fine combination of pals each with different mental make up, but goodness overflowing." Sujatha Narayanan, in a retrospective review for The New Indian Express commended Haasan's writing and Madhan's dialogue, finding them to be "peppered with sharp wit, trivia and emotional depth."

A reviewer from Sify, in comparison, labelled the film as "average", stating that it was "another predictable and corny film which is neither a comedy caper nor a class act." Similarly, Arkay of Rediff.com praised the performances of the lead cast but wrote the film "tries to do too many things, and ends up failing at most, if not all, of them." S.Anand of Outlook felt the film's thematic ideas of communism were presented in a "clichéd" manner, and summarised by saying, "If Rajnikant staked claim to divinity on a right-wing plank with Baba, Kamal does it with pretensions to rationalist-left rhetoric."

 Box office 
During the first week of its theatrical run, an analysis by Sudhish Kamath of The Hindu showed the film to have grossed 13.1 million in Chennai alone. Despite this, the film underperformed at the box office and incurred heavy losses for Lakshmi Movie Makers, effectively stopping them from investing in other ventures for the year 2003. An estimate by D.Govardan of The Economic Times places the losses at 65 million, while Arun Ram of India Today states the losses incurred to be 50 million. Srinivasa Ramanujam of The Times of India compared the film's failure at the box office to that of Baba. Both K. Muralitharan and Haasan defended the film's failure by blaming video piracy, with the latter stating that "lots of people saw it, but they didn't pay".

 Awards and nominations 

 Legacy 

Following its release, Anbe Sivam has attained cult status in Tamil cinema and receives re-runs on television channels. When the film was in post-production, Haasan revealed to film critic and journalist Subhash K. Jha that he was impressed with Madhavan's enthusiasm and performance during the making of the film, subsequently signing him to appear as the protagonist in his production venture, Nala Damayanthi (2003).

Baradwaj Rangan wrote that Anbe Sivam was "leagues ahead of the average Tamilwhy, even Indianfilm", though he felt that "the masses were unwilling to accept the experimental nature of the film", while talking about the film's box office failure. During his acceptance speech after winning the Vijay Award for Best Director in 2010 for Naan Kadavul (2009), director Bala revealed that a scene in Anbe Sivam where Haasan says to Madhavan, "when we love others unconditionally without any expectation, we become Gods", inspired him to make his film. Bala also made a reference to Anbe Sivam in his 2003 film, Pithamagan, in a scene where Suriya's character goes for a screening of the film with his friends. A dialogue told by Haasan to Madhavan, "Do you know what a tsunami is? Periya alai illa... malai." (It's not just a big wave... it's a mountain) also attained popularity.

In 2008, S.R. Ashok Kumar of The Hindu listed Anbe Sivam among the "top five directorial ventures of SundarC." In a 2008 interview with The Times of India, SundarC. stated that Anbe Sivam "changed [him] personally and professionally", making him a more confident person and altering his outlook towards life. He later contradicted his statement after revealing that the film's failure led him to become almost bankrupt and he remained unpaid for his work. The Income Tax Department froze his bank accounts for a year as he was not able to pay his taxes. He admitted that while he received praises for the film after its theatrical run, he would not make a film similar to Anbe Sivam anymore and that he chose to continue making commercial cinema, which he felt better matched his interests. In 2013, Haricharan Pudipeddi of the Indo-Asian News Service agency, included Anbe Sivam in his list of "Kamal's most underrated films". He believed the reason for the film's commercial failure was that audiences misunderstood the "sarcastic undertones associated with atheism". On Haasan's birthday, 7 November 2015, Latha Srinivasan of Daily News and Analysis considered Anbe Sivam to be one of the "films you must watch to grasp the breadth of Kamal Haasan's repertoire". The character of Nallasivam was ranked fourth in The Times of Indias list of "Kamal Haasan's top 10 mind-blowing avatars".

In Vasool Raja MBBS (2004), the character Vasool Raja (Haasan), while attending a class asks whether being a doctor is equivalent to being God, and in doing so says "Anbe Venkatachalam", to which one of his classmates gently asks him, "isn't it Anbe Sivam?". Haasan retorts: "Let it be. Let's try something different for a change." The street theatre sequence featuring Nallasivam and his friends performing to make people aware of the atrocities committed by Kandasamy Padayatchi was re-created at Tiruchirappalli in 2008 by Pralayan and his troupe from "Chennai Kalai Kuzhu" under the title Nammal Mudiyum. In contrast, Pralayan's play explored gender inequality and domestic violence instead of unemployment. Kannada actor Vishnuvardhan noted in 2010 that fellow actor Sudeep's film Just Maath Maathalli (2010) bears resemblance to Anbe Sivam. Hari Narayan, writing for The Hindu in 2014, mentions in his article on the Indian rationalist and author Narendra Dabholkar that Umesh Shukla's OMG – Oh My God! (2012) was "a toned down version of Anbe Sivam where rationality propels humans to find God in themselves, with flaws, which extols the virtue of becoming as much as that of being". In 2015 Uthiran of Hindu Tamil Thisai in Tamil, mentions in his review of Orange Mittai (2015) that the film's plot might remind viewers of Anbe Sivam.

Film

Notes

References

External links 
 
 

2000s avant-garde and experimental films
2000s road comedy-drama films
2000s Tamil-language films
2003 films
Films directed by Sundar C.
Films scored by Vidyasagar
Films set in Andhra Pradesh
Films set in Odisha
Films with screenplays by Kamal Haasan
Indian avant-garde and experimental films
Indian nonlinear narrative films
Indian road comedy-drama films